The Second Schmidt cabinet was the government of Germany between 16 December 1976 and 5 November 1980, during the 8th legislature of the Bundestag. Led by the Social Democrat Helmut Schmidt, the cabinet was a coalition between the Social Democrats (SDP) and the Free Democratic Party (FDP). The Vice-Chancellor was the Free Democrat Hans-Dietrich Genscher (FDP).

Composition 

|}

See also 
 Cabinet of Germany

References

Schmidt II
1976 establishments in West Germany
1980 disestablishments in West Germany
Cabinets established in 1976
Cabinets disestablished in 1980
Schmidt II
Helmut Schmidt